Guo Zhongze (born 7 August 1996 in Fushun, Liaoning) is a Chinese sprinter specialising in the 400 metres. He competed at the 2015 World Championships in Beijing without advancing from the first round.

His personal bests in the event are 45.66 seconds outdoors (Beijing 2015) and 47.95 seconds indoors (Doha 2016).

International competitions

References

Chinese male sprinters
Living people
Place of birth missing (living people)
1996 births
World Athletics Championships athletes for China
People from Fushun
Runners from Liaoning